Roy Cazaly (13 January 1893 – 10 October 1963) was an Australian rules footballer who played for South Melbourne and St Kilda in the Victorian Football League (VFL). He also represented Victoria and Tasmania in interstate football, and after his retirement as a player, turned to coaching. Known for his ruck work and high-flying marks, he inspired the common catchphrase "Up there, Cazaly!", which in 1979 became a popular song of the same name, securing his place in Australian folklore.

Cazaly was one of 12 inaugural "Legends" inducted into the Australian Football Hall of Fame.

Family
Cazaly was born in Albert Park, a suburb of Melbourne, on 13 January 1893. He was the tenth child of English-born James Cazaly and his wife Elizabeth Jemima (née McNee). James Cazaly was a renowned sculler and rower in Melbourne. Just before 6 July 1878 he was eliminated in a "semi-final" for the sculling championship of Victoria by the eventual victor, Charles A. Messenger. Elizabeth was a midwife and herbalist from Scotland.

Football
Cazaly learnt his football at the local state school, quickly becoming its first-choice ruckman. He tried out for VFL side Carlton Football Club in 1910, but quit the club when he injured a shoulder in a reserves match and could not get the Carlton medical staff to treat it.

St Kilda
Cazaly crossed to fellow VFL side St Kilda and made his senior debut in 1911 during a players' strike, when many of St Kilda's regular senior players refused to play as a result of a dispute with the club's committee over dressing rooms.

One of nine new players in the team, Cazaly played his only First XVIII match for St Kilda against Carlton, at Princes park, on 29 July 1911.

The other new players were: Alby Bowtell, Claude Crowl, Peter Donnelly, Alf Hammond, Otto Opelt, Rowley Smith, Tom Soutar, and Bill Ward – and, including that match, and ignoring Harrie Hattam (16 games), Bert Pierce (41 games), and Bill Woodcock (65 games), the very inexperienced team's remaining fifteen players had only played a total of 46 matches.

He played 99 matches with St Kilda.

South Melbourne
In 1920, he left St Kilda, signing with South Melbourne. He coached that club in 1922, and won South's most consistent player award in 1926.

During the depression of the early 1930s, he worked on the Melbourne waterfront and played with waterside workers in a midweek football competition.

VFL fame
Cazaly was famous for his ability to take spectacular marks despite his small stature, and, at South Melbourne, teammates Fred "Skeeter" Fleiter and Mark "Napper" Tandy, would simultaneously yell "Up there, Cazzer", originating the phrase that would become synonymous with Australian rules football. He initially developed his marking ability by jumping at a ball strung up in a shed at his home, and held his breath as he jumped, an action that he believed lifted him higher. He also possessed the capacity to kick a football over 65 metres. In 2009, The Australian nominated Cazaly as one of the 25 greatest footballers never to win a Brownlow Medal.

Coaching career
In 1928, he departed Victoria and headed for Launceston, Tasmania, before returning in 1931 to coach Preston in the Victorian Football Association.

His subsequent return to Tasmania was punctuated by short stints as non-playing coach of South Melbourne (in 1937–1938), coach of Camberwell (in 1941, at age 48, he was nominally a non-playing coach, but he did don a guernsey for a few games late in the season), non-playing coach of Hawthorn (in 1942–1943), and as non-playing assistant coach of South Melbourne in 1947.

While coaching Hawthorn, he was reported to have given the club its nickname the "Hawks", as he saw it as tougher than their original nickname the "Mayblooms".

Legacy
He is known to have played 322 premiership matches (198 in the VFL and 124 in the Tasmanian leagues), and 354 total career senior games (including 14 intrastate matches for the NTFA in Tasmania, and 18 interstate matches, 13 for Victoria and five for Tasmania). If his matches for Preston and Camberwell in the VFA are included, then Cazaly played in 343 premiership matches and 375 total career senior games. Cazaly also played country football for Minyip in 1925, and in a mid-week football competition during the 1930s.

Throughout his career, he stood at just , which is short for a ruckman, although his high leap made up for this, and he was incredibly fit. He retired from competitive football in 1941 at the age of 48. Later, he coached (non-playing) New Town to a number of Tasmanian Football League premierships. After his retirement from football, he was involved in many business ventures before his death in Hobart on 10 October 1963. His son, also named Roy, played for New Town after World War II.

The famous cry "Up there, Cazaly" was used as a battle-cry by Australian forces during World War II.

It is also the name of a famous song, released in 1979 by Mike Brady and the Two-Man Band.

Cazaly was inducted into the Australian Football Hall of Fame in 1996 as one of the inaugural twelve Legends.

Cazalys Stadium in Cairns, Queensland, is named after Roy Cazaly.

Notes

References
 Atkinson, G. (1982) Everything you ever wanted to know about Australian rules football but couldn't be bothered asking, The Five Mile Press: Melbourne. .

 Counihan, N. "Cazaly, Roy (1893–1963)", Australian Dictionary of Biography, National Centre of Biography, Australian National University, 1977.

External links

 Counihan, N. Cazaly, Roy (1893–1963) in Australian Dictionary of Biography 
 Roy Cazaly snr

1893 births
1963 deaths
Australian rules footballers from Melbourne
Australian Rules footballers: place kick exponents
Sydney Swans players
Sydney Swans coaches
St Kilda Football Club players
Hawthorn Football Club coaches
Trevor Barker Award winners
Camberwell Football Club players
Camberwell Football Club coaches
Preston Football Club (VFA) coaches
North Hobart Football Club coaches
Glenorchy Football Club coaches
City-South Football Club players
Preston Football Club (VFA) players
City-South Football Club coaches
Australian Football Hall of Fame inductees
Tasmanian Football Hall of Fame inductees
Australian waterside workers
Sport Australia Hall of Fame inductees
People from Albert Park, Victoria
Australian people of English descent
Australian people of Scottish descent